Aloeides rileyi, the Riley's copper, is a butterfly of the family Lycaenidae. It is found in South Africa, where it is known from Lesotho and the eastern part of the Free State.

The wingspan is 24–28 mm for males and 26–30 mm females. Adults are on wing from November to February. There is one generation per year.

References

Butterflies described in 1976
Aloeides